Moving Day may refer to:
Moving Day (Quebec), a traditional moving day in the province of Quebec
Moving Day (New York City) or "Rent Day", a traditional moving day in New York City
Moving Day (book), a book of poetry by Ralph Fletcher
Moving Day (1936 film), a Mickey Mouse cartoon
Moving Day (1998 film), a Canadian short film directed by Chris Deacon
Moving Day (2012 film), a Canadian feature film directed by Mike Clattenburg

Television episodes
"Moving Day" (The Goodies) or "The New Office"
"Moving Day" (How I Met Your Mother)
"Moving Day" (NYPD Blue)
"Moving Day" (The Shield)